Hajji (also Romanized as Ḩājjī; also known as Gholām Ḩoseyn Deh Mardeh, Borj-e Yūsef, and Borj-e Yūsof) is a village in Qorqori Rural District, Qorqori District, Hirmand County, Sistan and Baluchestan Province, Iran. At the 2006 census, its population was 291, in 58 families.

References 

Populated places in Hirmand County